KDL is a kernel error on operating systems such as BeOS/Haiku.

KDL may also refer to:

 Kadaloor LRT station, Singapore
 Kärdla Airport, Estonia
 Kent District Library, United States
Kevin de León, American politician
 Kirby's Dream Land
 Compagnie des Chemins de fer Katanga-Dilolo-Léopoldville, former railway company in the Belgian Congo